Echium tuberculatum is a species of flowering plant native to Portugal, Morocco, Algeria and Libya in the Iberian Peninsula and North Africa respectively. This plant is a hardy garden perennial and it forms a sprawling mass of red flowers during the whole of the summer.

It will self-seed readily.

References

tuberculatum
Flora of Portugal
Flora of North Africa